Little Red River 106D is an Indian reserve of the Lac La Ronge Indian Band in Saskatchewan. It is 25 miles north of Prince Albert, and in Township 53, Range 1, west of the Third Meridian. In the 2016 Canadian Census, it recorded a population of 5 living in 1 of its 3 total private dwellings.

References

Indian reserves in Saskatchewan
Division No. 16, Saskatchewan